California Hollow is a valley in the Black Mountains in Beaver and Iron County, Utah.

History
California Hollow lay along part of the original route of what was known during the California Gold Rush as the Southern Route of the California Trail, (later the Mormon Road), which passed over the Black Mountains between Greenville, Utah and Muley Point, on the way to California. In 1855 the Mormon Road was realigned eastward from this old route over the Black Mountains to one from a crossing at Beaver, Utah to Muley Point through more wagon friendly terrain in Nevershine Hollow and over Beaver Ridge into the canyon of Fremont Wash that rejoined the original road above Muley Point.

References

Valleys of Beaver County, Utah
Valleys of Iron County, Utah
Valleys of Utah
Old Spanish Trail (trade route)
Mormon Road